True Law is a Polish legal drama television series airing on TVN. It premiered on 4 March 2012 at 8:00 p.m. with two back-to-back episodes.

Series overview

Episode list

Series 1: Spring 2012

References

External links
Official site

True Law at Distribution.tvn.pl (English)

True Law